The FIA Formula 3 European Championship was a multi-event motor racing championship for open wheel, formula racing cars held across Europe. The championship featured drivers competing in 2-litre Formula Three Dallara single seat race cars that conform to the technical regulations for the championship. The 2013 season was the second edition of the FIA Formula 3 European Championship organized by the FIA. The season began at Autodromo Nazionale Monza on 23 March and finished on 20 October at Hockenheimring. The series formed part of the Deutsche Tourenwagen Masters meetings at seven triple header events, with other triple header events as part of the World Touring Car Championship, the FIA World Endurance Championship and the Superstars Series.

The championship was won by 2012 runner-up Raffaele Marciello, driving for Prema Powerteam. Mücke's Felix Rosenqvist finished behind Marciello for the second year in a row, finishing 32.5 points behind. Marciello's teammates Alex Lynn and Lucas Auer finished third and fourth respectively, allowing Prema to clinch the teams' championship. Carlin's driver Harry Tincknell completed the top five with a win at his home round at Silverstone. Non-regular drivers Pascal Wehrlein – prior to moving into the DTM – and Daniil Kvyat were the only drivers outside the top five, who took a race win.

Drivers and teams
All cars were equipped with Hankook tyres.

Driver changes
 Hannes van Asseldonk announced that he retired from racing at the end of the 2012 season.
 After two races for Van Amersfoort Racing in 2012, Lucas Auer switched to Prema Powerteam in 2013.
 2012 ma-con Motorsport driver Emil Bernstorff, had lost his seat at the team and signed with Lotus in German Formula Three.
 Tom Blomqvist, who competed for ma-con Motorsport in 2012, moved to EuroInternational, who are making their début in the championship in 2013.
 Richard Bradley left the championship to take part in a full Super Formula season with KCMG in 2013.
 William Buller, who drove for Carlin in 2012, switched to the ThreeBond with T-Sport team.
 Newcomers Double R Racing signed European F3 Open driver Tatiana Calderón and Formula Pilota China frontrunners Sean Gelael and Antonio Giovinazzi.
 Superstars Series team Romeo Ferraris joined the championship, with their 2011 Superstars driver Michela Cerruti signed as their first driver.
 Italian Formula Three drivers Eddie Cheever III and Nicholas Latifi joined Prema Powerteam and Carlin respectively.
 2012 Carlin drivers Pietro Fantin and Jazeman Jaafar left the series, switching to Formula Renault 3.5.
 Mitchell Gilbert and Roy Nissany made their debut in the series for Mücke Motorsport, moving from German Formula Three and ADAC Formel Masters respectively.
 Måns Grenhagen moved from European F3 Open to the championship, racing for Van Amersfoort Racing.
 Josh Hill, who drove for Fortec Motorsports in the 2012 Formula Renault 2.0 Northern European Cup, continued his association with the team, in 2013.
 Ed Jones will take Dmitry Suranovich's seat at the Fortec Motorsports team at the first Hockenheimring round.
 Daniel Juncadella, who won the 2012 championship with Prema Powerteam, left the series, joining Mercedes-Benz in the Deutsche Tourenwagen Masters.
 Jordan King, the 2012 Formula Renault 2.0 NEC runner-up, entered the series with Carlin.
 Daniil Kvyat joined Carlin for a one-off as the fifth driver of the team at the first Hockenheimring round. Later he announced he made a deal to stay with the team for the rest of the season.
 Michael Lewis lost his seat at Prema Powerteam. Later, he was announced at Mücke Motorsport as the replacement for DTM-bound Pascal Wehrlein.
 Alex Lynn switched from Fortec Motorsports to Prema Powerteam.
 After placing sixth in the GT3 class of the 2012 British GT Championship, Jann Mardenborough made his Formula Three debut, driving for Carlin.
 After one season with Prema Powerteam in 2012, Sven Müller switched to ma-con Motorsport for 2013.
 Jo Zeller Racing's Andrea Roda moved to the Auto GP with Virtuosi UK.
 German Formula Three Trophy Class champion André Rudersdorf graduated to the championship with ma-con Motorsport.
 Angolan driver Luís Sá Silva and Carlin driver Carlos Sainz Jr. moved to the GP3 Series, driving for Carlin and MW Arden respectively.
 GP3 Series driver Dmitry Suranovich switched to the championship with Fortec Motorsports.
 After three seasons competing in the All-Japan Formula Three Championship national class, Gary Thompson entered the series with Romeo Ferraris, competing with a Japanese racing licence.

Calendar
A provisional ten-round calendar was announced on 18 November 2012. To accommodate the change of date, the Zandvoort meeting was moved from July to September. On 1 June 2013, the Le Castellet round was removed from the calendar, and was ultimately replaced by a round at Vallelunga.

Results

Championship standings
Scoring system

Drivers' championship
The third race at Monza was red-flagged after half the race had been completed due to torrential rain. As a result, series organisers awarded half points to each of the classified finishers eligible to score points.

(key)

† — Drivers did not finish the race, but were classified as they completed over 90% of the race distance.

Ravenol Team Trophy
Prior to each round of the championship, two drivers from each team – if applicable – are nominated to score teams' championship points.

Footnotes

References

External links

FIA Formula 3 European Championship
FIA Formula 3 European Championship
FIA Formula 3 European Championship
Formula 3